Moira Orfei (born Miranda Orfei; 21 December 1931 – 15 November 2015) was an Italian circus performer, actress and television personality of remote Romani origins. Moira was also considered the queen of the Italian circus, one stage name being "Moira of the Elephants". Cult movie fans know her for the many sword-and-sandal (peplum) films she starred in.

Biography

Raised in a family who owned the circus company Circus Orfei, Moira became the symbol of circus in Italy and attained international fame. The Circus Moira Orfei itself was founded in 1960. She was photographed in various scenes as a rider, trapeze artist, acrobat, dominatrice of elephants and trainer of doves.

Her excessively garish image mirrors her eccentric and exuberant personality. It was Dino De Laurentiis who suggested that she change her name from Miranda to Moira. From then on, her face became an effigy of unchanging characteristics: heavy make-up with eyes coated with eyeliner, bright lipstick, an accentuated mole above the lip, hair tied in a turban. Promotional billboards were carpeted with this picture in every city that the circus stopped. She also became a film actress, acting in over forty films, from comedies to sword and sandal films (among which were many Italian crime films).

Personal life
Her parents were Riccardo Orfei, who was the clown Bigolon, and Violetta Arata. She married Walter Nones in 1961, and they had two children Stefano Orfei and Lara Orfei.

Death
On 4 August 2006, Moira Orfei suffered an ischemic stroke during a show in Gioiosa Ionica. The artist was still under medical care when she died nine years later from natural causes on 15 November 2015 in Brescia, Italy.

Filmography

See also
Anastasini Circus

References

External links

 
 

Orfei, Moira
1931 births
2015 deaths
Italian Romani people
Romani actresses
20th-century circus performers
20th-century Italian actresses
21st-century Italian actresses
People from the Province of Udine